Wagneriana tauricornis is a species of orb weaver in the family Araneidae. It is found in USA to Peru.

References

Further reading

External links
 
 

Araneidae
Spiders described in 1889